The Mária Valéria Bridge joins Esztergom in Hungary and Štúrovo in Slovakia, across the River Danube. The bridge is some 500 metres in length. It is named after Archduchess Marie Valerie of Austria (1868–1924), the fourth child of the Emperor of Austria-Hungary, Franz Josef and Elisabeth.

Since its opening on 28 September 1895, the bridge has been destroyed twice. On 22 July 1919 the bridge was destroyed by a detonation at its first pier on its western side but the bridge was renovated in 1922 and completely reconstructed in 1926. During World War II, retreating German troops blew up the bridge on 26 December 1944 along with other bridges near Esztergom.

Decades of intransigence between the Communist governments of Hungary and Czechoslovakia meant that the bridge was not rebuilt until the new millennium, finally reopening on 11 October 2001. Half the costs of the project were covered by a 10 million Euro grant from the European Union, as part of the EU PHARE project to assist applicant countries in their preparations to join the EU. The re-opening was marked with the issue of a Slovak stamp. The rebuilding of the bridge helped the local economy in the Ister-Granum Euroregion.

As Slovakia and Hungary are part of the Schengen Area there are no border controls on the bridge. Both countries became part of the Schengen Area on 12 December 2007, allowing all immigration and customs checks to be lifted.

As a young man, the writer Patrick Leigh Fermor walked from the Hook of Holland to Constantinople in 1933/34. His book A Time of Gifts ends on the bridge and the second volume, Between the Woods and the Water, begins with him crossing into Esztergom.

See also
List of crossings of the Danube River

References

External links

History of the Bridge
Bridgeguard Project

Bridges over the Danube
Bridges in Slovakia
Bridges in Hungary
Buildings and structures in Esztergom
Bridges completed in 1895
International bridges
Hungary–Slovakia border crossings
19th-century architecture in Slovakia
21st-century architecture in Slovakia